Benjamin Franklin Johnson (July 28, 1818 – November 18, 1905) was an early member of Latter Day Saint Movement, and a member of the Council of Fifty and a formerly private secretary to Joseph Smith.  He served fourteen terms in the Utah State Legislature and was also a brickmaker, merchant, tavern keeper, leatherworker, farmer, nurseryman, and beekeeper.

Early life
Born to Ezekiel Johnson and Julia Hills at Pomfret, New York, he moved to Kirtland, Ohio in 1833. He married Melissa Bloomfield LeBaron on Christmas Day, December 25, 1841.

Latter Day Saint Movement
Benjamin was baptized into the Church of the Latter Day Saints at Kirtland by Lyman E. Johnson in the spring of 1835. He served as a missionary for his new faith to the eastern United States and Upper Canada between 1840 and 1842. He was appointed to Joseph Smith's Council of Fifty in 1843.

In 1838 he moved to Adam-ondi-Ahman, Missouri where he was arrested and kept under guard for eight days in intensely cold weather before an open campfire. While he was sitting on a log, a "brute" came up to him with a rifle in his hands and said, "You give up Mormonism right now, or I'll shoot you." Benjamin decisively refused, upon which the ruffian took deliberate aim at him and pulled the trigger. The gun failed to discharge. Cursing fearfully, the man declared that he had "used the gun 20 years and it had never before missed fire." Examining the lock, he reprimed the weapon and again aimed and pulled the trigger—without effect.
Following the same procedure he tried a third time, but the result was the same. A bystander told him to "fix up his gun a little" and then "you can kill the cuss all right." So for a fourth and final time the would-be murderer prepared, even putting in a fresh load. However, Benjamin declared, "This time the gun bursted and killed the wretch upon the spot." One of the Missourians was heard to say, "You'd better not try to kill that man."  

He moved to Springfield, Illinois in 1839, Ramus (later Webster) in 1842, Nauvoo in 1845, and Bonaparte, Iowa Territory in 1846. In 1848 he arrived in the Salt Lake Valley with the Church of Jesus Christ of Latter-day Saints (LDS Church) and served in the Utah territorial legislature from 1855 to 1867. Johnson left Utah for the Arizona Territory in 1882, settling in Tempe before going to Colonia Diaz, Chihuahua, Mexico in 1890 and returning to Arizona in 1892. He died at Mesa.

Plural marriage

Johnson's sister married Joseph Smith as a plural marriage.  Johnson records the event where Joseph Smith approached Johnson about the arrangement:

Johnson himself became a noted polygamist, and would eventually have eight wives.

Relations
Johnson was the brother of hymnwriter Joel H. Johnson.

LeBaron Family
In 1955, the LeBaron Family, who form the Church of the Firstborn of the Fulness of Times, a Mormon fundamentalist sect headquartered in northern Mexico, by claimed priesthood authority through Benjamin.
 Alma Dayer LeBaron Sr. (grandson)
Joel LeBaron
Ervil LeBaron

See also
A Banner Is Unfurled - a historical fiction series about the Johnson family

References

Further reading
.
.

External links
Our Heritage, p. 49
Profile from BYU

Johnson Family journals and correspondence, MSS 3095 at L. Tom Perry Special Collections, Brigham Young University

1818 births
1905 deaths
American expatriates in Mexico
American leaders of the Church of Jesus Christ of Latter-day Saints
Converts to Mormonism
Latter Day Saints from Arizona
Latter Day Saints from Illinois
Latter Day Saints from Missouri
Latter Day Saints from New York (state)
Latter Day Saints from Ohio
Latter Day Saints from Utah
Leaders in the Church of Christ (Latter Day Saints)
Members of the Utah Territorial Legislature
Mormon fundamentalism
Mormon pioneers
People from Pomfret, New York